George Dudley (May 8, 1897 – June 5, 1959) was an American art director. He was nominated an Academy Award in the category of Best Art Direction for the film The Rains Came.

Filmography
 The Caribbean Mystery (1945)
 To the Shores of Tripoli (1942)
 The Bride Wore Crutches (1941)
 Chad Hanna (1940)
 Street of Memories (1940)
 Manhattan Heartbeat (1940)
 On Their Own (1940)
 High School (1940)
 The Man Who Wouldn't Talk (1940)
 Too Busy to Work (1939)
 The Rains Came (1939)
 Stanley and Livingstone (1939)
 Jesse James (1939)

References

External links

American art directors
1897 births
1959 deaths
Artists from Michigan